Hisham I Al-Reda ibn Abd ar-Rahman was the second Emir of Cordoba, ruling from 788 to 796 in al-Andalus.

Hisham was born April 26, 757 in Cordoba. He was the first son of Abd al-Rahman I (r. 756-788) and his wife, Halul, and the younger half brother of Suleiman.

Domestic rebellions
At the beginning of his reign, in 788, he faced rebellions from his brothers, Suleiman and 'Abd Allah.

Expedition to Septimania 
Faced with Carolingian penetration south across the western and eastern Pyrenees, in 793 he called a jihad against the Christian Franks, sent over troops to Girona and Narbonne, but those strongholds stood firm. The Umayyad general Abd al-Malik ibn Abd al-Wahid ibn Mughith was more fortunate on his approach to Carcassonne, where he defeated Louis the Pious' Carolingian mentor William of Orange. However, surprisingly, the expedition did not advance deeper into Carolingian territory, but resulted in hefty loot and numerous slaves, which in turn provided the funds to expand the Great Mosque of Cordoba and build many mosques.

Expeditions against Asturians and Basques
As of 794, his generals, the above-mentioned Abd al-Malik and his brother Abd al-Karim ibn Abd al-Wahid ibn Mughith, campaigned every year of his reign against the northern principalities, namely Álava, Old Castile, and Asturias, deep into the last's newly established capital city of Oviedo (794). The city in turn was sacked. Alfonso II of Asturias fled, and initiated contacts with Charlemagne. These expeditions didn't aim to destroy the northern Christian principalities, but seem to have been a goal in themselves, raids for the purpose of amassing loot and re-asserting Cordovan military superiority over both restive local Andalusian garrisons and lords prone to detachment, the Kingdom of Asturias, and the Basques.

Death and assessment
Hisham died in 796 C.E. at the age of forty, after a rule of eight years. He was a prototype of Umar II, and strove to establish the Islamic way of life, living simply and avoiding ostentation. He was a God-fearing man and was known for his impartial justice and sound administration. After his death, 'Abd Allah returned from exile and claimed Valencia and Suleiman claimed Tangiers against Hisham's son, al-Hakam I.

Hisham was dubbed “the just.”

Hisham was a model of righteousness and a loyal prince. He lived in hopes of salvation and at the time of his succession to the throne, he believed, on the basis of his horoscope, that he had just eight years to live. He, therefore, abandoned all earthly enjoyments and sought redemption through charitable giving. He wore the simplest clothes, he would walk alone through the roads of Cordova, mingle with the ordinary people, visit the sick, enter the dwellings of the poor, and with genuine concern showed interest in all of their needs, requests, and complaints. At night, even in the pouring rain, he would take food from his palace and bring it to the poor. He was prompt in his religious duties, he urged his subjects to follow his example, and on rainy nights would dispense his wealth to those taking part in evening services at the mosques. After eight years, Hisham died as predicted and left to his successor a respectable kingdom.

References

Emirs of Córdoba
8th-century rulers in Europe
757 births
796 deaths
8th-century Arabs